Franc Smolej (born July 18, 1940) is a Slovenian retired professional ice hockey player.

Career
Smolej played for HK Acroni Jesenice in the Yugoslav Ice Hockey League and the Yugoslavia national ice hockey team at the Winter Olympics in 1964 and 1968.

References

1940 births
Living people
HK Acroni Jesenice players
Ice hockey players at the 1964 Winter Olympics
Ice hockey players at the 1968 Winter Olympics
Olympic ice hockey players of Yugoslavia
Sportspeople from Jesenice, Jesenice
Slovenian ice hockey centres
Yugoslav ice hockey centres